Sabelo Radebe (born 3 February 2000) is a South African soccer player who plays as an attacking midfielder or winger for South African Premier Division side Kaizer Chiefs.

Sabelo Radebe made his debut against Orlando Pirates when they won 4–3 on penalties in a match that ended in a 1–1 draw.

References

Living people
2000 births
South African soccer players
Sportspeople from Durban
Association football midfielders
Kaizer Chiefs F.C. players
South African Premier Division players